Events in the year 2011 in Croatia.

Incumbents
President – Ivo Josipović
Prime Minister – Jadranka Kosor
Speaker – Luka Bebić (until 22 December), Boris Šprem (from 22 December)

Events
 June 11 – The first Split Pride is held.
 July 19 – Former prime minister Ivo Sanader is extradited from Austria
 December 4 – Croatian parliamentary election, 2011

Arts and entertainment
In music: Croatia in the Eurovision Song Contest 2011.

Sports
Football (soccer) competitions: Prva HNL, Druga HNL, Croatian Cup. For more in football (soccer) see: 2010–11 in Croatian football.

In motorsports, Croatia will host the 2011 Speedway Grand Prix of Croatia.

Deaths
January 3 – Fadil Hadžić, playwright and film director (born 1922)
April 18 – Ivica Vidović, actor (born 1939)
June 24 – Tomislav Ivić, football manager
July 21 – Slavomir Miklovš, Greek Catholic bishop of the Eparchy of Križevci
July 29 – Ivan Milas, politician
September 18 – Ivo Škrabalo, film critic and screenwriter
October 20 – Iztok Puc, handball player (born 1966)
November 10 – Ana Grepo, businesswoman and model
November 28 – Ante Marković, politician (born 1924)
December 10 – Vida Jerman, actress (born 1939)

See also
2011 in Croatian television

References

 
Croatia
Years of the 21st century in Croatia
2010s in Croatia
Croatia